Baron Martonmere, of Blackpool in the County Palatine of Lancaster, is a title in the Peerage of the United Kingdom. It was created in 1964 for the Conservative politician Sir Roland Robinson.

, the title is held by his grandson, John Stephen Robinson, 2nd Baron Martonmere, who succeeded in 1989. He is the eldest son of the Hon. Richard Anthony Gasque Robertson (1935-1979), only son of the first Baron.

Barons Martonmere (1964)
(John) Roland Robinson, 1st Baron Martonmere (1907–1989)
The Hon. Richard Anthony Gasque Robertson (1935–1979), only son of the 1st Baron
John Stephen Robinson, 2nd Baron Martonmere (b. 1963), eldest son of the above

The heir apparent is the present holder's son, the Hon. James Ian Robinson (b. 2003)

Line of Succession

  John Roland Robinson, 1st Baron Martonmere (1907—1989)
 Hon. Richard Anthony Gasque Robinson (1935—1979)
  John Stephen Robinson, 2nd Baron Martonmere (born 1963)
 (1) Hon. James Ian Robinson (b. 2003)
 (2) Hon. Andrew Roland Robinson (b. 2005)
 (3) David Alan Robinson (b. 1965)

Arms

Notes

References
Kidd, Charles, Williamson, David (editors). Debrett's Peerage and Baronetage (1990 edition). New York: St Martin's Press, 1990,

External links
 
 

Baronies in the Peerage of the United Kingdom
Noble titles created in 1964
Noble titles created for UK MPs